The IEEE Herman Halperin Electric Transmission and Distribution Award is a Technical Field Award of the IEEE that is presented for outstanding contributions to electric transmission and distribution. The award may be presented annually to an individual or a team of up to three people. It was instituted by the IEEE Board of Directors in 1986.

Prior to 1987, the award was called the William M. Habirshaw Award. Starting in 1987, the award became renamed in honor of Herman Halperin, who had been a recipient of the Habirshaw Award in 1962 and had worked for 40 years for the Commonwealth Edison Company. The award is sponsored by the Robert and Ruth Halperin Foundation, in memory of Herman and Edna Halperin, and the IEEE Power and Energy Society. The funds for the award were contributed by the Halperins, and are administered by the IEEE Foundation.

Recipients of this award receive a certificate and honorarium.

Recipients 
Source

 1987: Robert F. Lawrence
 1988: Luigi Paris
 1989: John J. Daugherty
 1990: John A. Casazza
 1991: John G. Anderson
 1992: Andrew R. Hileman
 1993: Mat Darveniza
 1994: Abdel-Aziz A Fouad
 1995: Vernon L. Chartier
 1996: Farouk A. M. Rizk
 1997: B. Don Russell
 1998: Vincent T. Morgan
 1999: Charles L. Wagner
 2000: Arun G. Phadke
 2001: Arthur C. Westrom
 2002: John J. Vithayathil
 2003: Sarma Maruvada
 2004: Andrew J. Eriksson
 2005: James J. Burke
 2006: Anjan Bose
 2007: Eric B. Forsyth
 2008: Robert C. Degeneff
 2009: Carson W. Taylor
 2010: Carlos Katz
 2011: John H. Brunke
 2012: Michel Duval
 2013: Vijay Vittal
 2014: Willem Boone
 2015: Wolfram Boeck
 2016: George Anders
 2017: George Dorwart Rockefeller
 2018: Jinliang He
 2019: Steven A. Boggs
 2020: Dusan Povh
 2021: Brian Stott

References

External links 
 IEEE Herman Halperin Electric Transmission and Distribution Award page at IEEE
 List of recipients of the IEEE Herman Halperin Electric Transmission and Distribution Award

Herman Halperin Electric Transmission and Distribution Award